was a town located in Kanoashi District, Shimane Prefecture, Japan.

As of 2003, the town had an estimated population of 4,255 and a density of 25.44 persons per km2. The total area was 167.24 km2.

On September 25, 2005, Nichihara was merged into the expanded town of Tsuwano.

The town has a sky observatory which once had one of the biggest lenses in Japan.

The Takatsu river runs through the town and in the summer season fishermen catch Ayu fish, a local delicacy. It is said to be the cleanest river in Japan, thus producing said Ayu fish.

Dissolved municipalities of Shimane Prefecture